Ricardo Independent School District is a public school district in Kleberg County, Texas (USA).

The district has two campuses - Ricardo Middle (Grades 5-8) and Ricardo Elementary (Grades PK-4).

In 2009, the school district was rated "recognized" by the Texas Education Agency.

High school students move on to Kaufer Early College High School, which is operated by Riviera Independent School District.

References

External links
 

School districts in Kleberg County, Texas